Wulu was a chieftain of the Wanyan tribe, the most dominant among the Jurchen tribes which later founded the Jin dynasty (1115–1234). He was the eldest son of Hanpu, who is regarded as the ancestor of the Wanyan clan. Wulu was given the posthumous name Emperor De (德皇帝) by his descendant, Emperor Xizong.

Family
 Father: Hanpu
 Mother: Hanpu's primary consort, posthumously honoured as Empress Mingyi (明懿皇后)
 Spouse: Name unknown, posthumously honoured as Empress Si (思皇后)
 Sons:
 Bahai
 Beilu (輩魯)

References
 

Jurchen rulers